Titas is an upazila of Comilla District in the Division of Chittagong, Bangladesh. It has a rich heritage of culture and tradition. This upazilla was formerly under Daudkandi upazilla. In 2005, it has been made a entirely new upazilla.

History
Titas was created in 2004. It split with nine Unions from Daudkandi Upazila. The name Titas named after the river Titas. Then minister and local MP Khandaker Mosharraf Hossain proposed the name.

Location
It has Homna Upazila of Comilla District on the north, Daudkandi Upazila on the south, Muradnagar Upazila on the east and Meghna Upazila on the west.

Demographics

According to the 2011 Census of Bangladesh, Titas upazila had a population of 184,617 living in 36,068 households. Titas has a sex ratio of 1120 females per 1000 males and a literacy rate of 43.04%. 3,532 (1.91%) live in urban areas.

Administration
Titas Upazila is divided into nine union parishads:Balorampur, Jagatpur, Kalakandi, Karikandi, Majidpur, Narayandia, Satani, Vitikandi, Zearkandi. The union parishads are subdivided into 61 mauzas and 138 villages.

Notable residents
 Atiqul Islam - Mayor, Dhaka North City Corporation
 Md Mainul Islam - former chief, Border Guards Bangladesh
Abdul Matin- Deputy Secretary at Ministary of Public Administration / BCS1986 Batch  (Ex APS to ex PM Begum Khaleda Zia)
 Suman Chandra Das - Entrepreneur, Son of Sunil Chandra Das
 Md. Tafazzul Islam - 17th Chief Justice of Bangladesh.
 Ferdous Ahmed - Bangladeshi Film Actor.
 Mohammad Moinuddin Abdullah - Former Senior Secretary, Ministry of Agriculture and Managing Director of Palli Karma-Sahayak Foundation(PKSF) .

See also
Upazilas of Bangladesh
Districts of Bangladesh
Divisions of Bangladesh

References

 
Upazilas of Comilla District